Jordi González-Pola González (born 12 April 2000) is a Spanish professional footballer who plays as a central defender for Sporting B.

Club career
Born in Barcelona, Catalonia, Pola was a Sporting de Gijón youth graduate. On 23 August 2019, after finishing his formation, he was loaned to Tercera División side Caudal Deportivo for the season.

On 3 October 2019, after just 27 minutes of action, Pola moved to fellow fourth tier side Urraca CF also in a temporary deal. On 25 August 2020, he signed for Segunda División B side CD Lealtad.

On 18 June 2021, Pola returned to Sporting and was assigned to the reserves in Tercera División RFEF. He made his first team debut on 29 May, starting in a 0–1 Segunda División home loss against UD Las Palmas.

References

External links

2000 births
Living people
Footballers from Barcelona
Spanish footballers
Association football defenders
Segunda División players
Segunda División B players
Tercera División players
Tercera Federación players
Sporting de Gijón B players
Caudal Deportivo footballers
CD Lealtad players
Sporting de Gijón players